Piletocera quadralis is a moth in the family Crambidae. It was described by Snellen in 1901. It is found in Indonesia (Java).

References

Q
Endemic fauna of Indonesia
Moths of Indonesia
Fauna of Java
Moths described in 1901